Grant Roy Hunter  (born November 9, 1967)  is a Canadian politician who was elected in the 2015 and 2019 Alberta general elections to represent the electoral districts of Cardston-Taber-Warner and Taber-Warner in the 29th and 30th Alberta Legislature, respectively.

Electoral record

2019 general election

2015 general election

References

Wildrose Party MLAs
Living people
1967 births
Brigham Young University alumni
Canadian Latter Day Saints
21st-century Canadian politicians
People from Cardston
United Conservative Party MLAs
Members of the Executive Council of Alberta